

The Amtmann or Ammann (in Switzerland) was an official in German-speaking countries of Europe and in some of the Nordic countries from the time of the Middle Ages whose office was akin to that of a bailiff. He was the most senior retainer (Dienstmann) of an Amt; the administrative office of a territorial lord (Landesherr) created to manage the estates of manors (Gutshöfe), castles and villages. The estates were both administrative as well as juridical districts. The Amtmann was usually a member of the nobility or a cleric. In towns, he was also often a member of the wealthy classes amongst the citizenship. He resided in an Amthaus or Amtshaus and collected taxes from the district (Amtsbezirk), administered justice and maintained law and order with a small, armed unit.

Later, the word Beamter superseded the older word Amtmann and has come to mean "official" or "civil servant". The word Amtmann is derived from ambet-ambachtos - "one sent round", Celtic: Latin ambactus "envoy", "herold", "servant", French, ambassadeur, "ambassador". By contrast, the Icelandic word ambátt, "female slave" and the Norwegian ambått "room maid", "maiden", emerged from the Celtic-Latin via Old German/Old Nordic.

In Holstein during the Danish era (to 1864) the Amtmann was the senior official of a sovereign department (landesherrliches Amt). As head of the administration he was subordinate from 1546 to the ministry (German Chancellery) in Copenhagen. The Amtmann was also a secular judge of the trial court (erster Instanz) and, together with the Propst or provost, made up the ecclesiastical court or consistory (Konsistorium). In a literary testimony to the office, Detlev von Liliencron wrote a ballad called "Pidder Lüng" in which there is an Amtmann of Tønder, called Henning Pogwisch.

In Switzerland the Ammann (Amtmann) was an office, since the Middle Ages, elected by the citizens who was the leader of the executive of a canton (Landammann), a town (Stadtammann) or a parish (Gemeindeammann).

Official use today 
Today in Germany, an Amtmann is the official title for an official (Beamter) of pay band (Besoldungsordnung) A 11 in the "upper service" level (gehobener Dienst) of the German Civil Service, corresponding to an Army Captain.

In the Austrian state of Burgenland, Amtmann is the title of a municipal official.

The feminine form, Amtfrau (e.g. Regierungsamtfrau - RAmtfr - or Zollamtfrau - ZAF) has become widely accepted. For a time the word Amtmännin was also used instead of Amtfrau. This term was formerly the norm in several German states and the federal administration. It has however largely disappeared, albeit in the Federal Customs Administration the title Zollamtmännin (an alternative to Zollamtfrau) has been chosen. Originally the introduction of official titles such as Justizamtfrau was started in the 1970s by a Lower Saxon female official/law enforcement officer who refused her posting order as long as it was not made out in the feminine form. In Switzerland, a female Landammann is usually titled and referred to as Frau Landammann.

See also 
 Amman (disambiguation)
 Ammann (disambiguation)
 Bezirksamtmann

General and cited references 
 Hans-Cord Sarnighausen: "Die alten Amtschreiber und Amtmänner", in: Zeitschrift für Niederdeutsche Familienkunde, Issue 4/2000, pp. 147–152.

External links 

 Karl Kroeschell: Der Amtmann. Zur Kulturgeschichte eines Juristenberufs. 2000
 

Civil services
German feudalism
Obsolete occupations
Gubernatorial titles
Titles